Waterloo is a semi-soft, cow's milk cheese produced by Village Maid Cheese Ltd in Riseley, Berkshire.

Production 
Similar to brie, the cheese is made from full-fat, unpasteurised Guernsey milk.  The affinage period is between 4 and 10 weeks, and the cheese has a fat content of 45%.

References 

Cow's-milk cheeses
English cheeses
Culture in Berkshire